

The Powell P-70 Acey Deucy is an American two-seat parasol wing monoplane designed and built by John C. Powell for amateur construction.

Design and development
The design of the P-70 Acey Deucy was started by former United States Navy Commander John C. Powell in 1966 with construction commencing in 1967. It was certified by the Federal Aviation Administration in the experimental homebuilt category and the prototype first flew on 20 June 1970. Following testing the design was sold as plans for homebuilding.

The Acey Deucy is a two-seat parasol-wing monoplane with vee-bracing struts on each side supporting the composite structure fabric-covered wing. The fabric-covered fuselage and tail unit are a welded steel-tube structure with wire-bracing on the tail unit. The Acey Deucy can be powered by a sole piston engine rated between 65 and 90 hp, the prototype had a  Continental A65 air-cooled engine driving a metal two-bladed fixed-pitch propeller. The conventional landing gear has a tailskid and the fuselage has two open cockpits in tandem, the front cockpit has a small door on the starboard side.

Specifications (Prototype)

See also

References

Notes

Bibliography

1970s United States civil utility aircraft
Homebuilt aircraft
Parasol-wing aircraft
Single-engined tractor aircraft
Aircraft manufactured in the United States
Aircraft first flown in 1970